James O'Hara (born James Fitzsimons; 11 September 1927 – 3 December 1992), also credited as James Lilburn, was an Irish-born American actor. He is best known for his appearance in the film Suddenly (1954). O'Hara was the brother of Irish actress and singer Maureen O'Hara. His name was sometimes spelled as FitzSimons.

Filmography

Film

Television

References

External links 

Rotten Tomatoes profile

1927 births
1992 deaths
American male film actors
Irish male film actors
Irish emigrants to the United States
People from Ranelagh
20th-century American male actors